Vama Veche (historical names: Ilanlâk, Ilanlâc) is a town in  Constanța County, Romania, on the Black Sea coast, near the border with Bulgaria, at 28.57 E longitude, 43.75 N latitude. It is part of the commune of Limanu and in 2002, it had a population of 178.

History 

It was founded in 1811 by a few Gagauz families, originally being named "Ilanlîk". Its current name literally means "Old customs", named so after Southern Dobruja (also known as the Cadrilater in Romanian) had been included in Romania in 1913. In 1940, however, that region was transferred to Bulgaria, and the town has since lain once again near the border, but the name stuck.

Even in communist Romania, Vama Veche had the reputation of a non-mainstream tourist destination, which has only grown since the Romanian Revolution of 1989. During the communist era, concern for border patrol sight lines spared Vama Veche the development that occurred in other Romanian Black Sea resorts. It became a hangout for intellectuals beginning in the 1960s, when writers and intellectuals used to spend their summers here. Accommodations consisted of tents or rooms rented from local peasants or fishermen. While camping is theoretically not permitted, to this day, many visitors or semi-permanent residents still stay in tents on the beach.

Recent developments 

Famous for its nude beach since the late 1990s, Vama Veche has experienced development and gentrification, which has led to a "Save Vama Veche" campaign that is lobbying for the area's environmental conservation and a halt to development and mass tourism. 

Nudism is still common on the beach today, especially on the northern part where the beach ends and the area is less crowded. A major part of the "Save Vama Veche" campaign is the 2003 founding of the Stufstock music festival. Both "Save Vama Veche" campaign and Stufstock Festival were initiated by the "Association for the Conservation of Bio-Cultural Protected Areas" NGO. The August 2003 festival drew a crowd of about 10,000. The 2004 edition drew about 20,000 people. The 2005 Stufstock drew a record 40,000-large crowd, formed mainly by rockers, bohemians, punkers, and goths.

Image gallery

References 

Seaside resorts in Romania
Bulgaria–Romania border crossings
Populated coastal places in Romania